One Day International (ODI) cricket is played between international cricket teams who are Full Members of the International Cricket Council (ICC) as well as the top four Associate members. Unlike Test matches, ODIs consist of one inning per team, having a limit in the number of overs, currently 50 overs per innings – although in the past this has been 55 or 60 overs. ODI cricket is List-A cricket, so statistics and records set in ODI matches also count toward List-A records. The earliest match recognized as an ODI was played between England and Australia in January 1971; since when there have been over 4,000 ODIs played by 28 teams. 
This is a list of Sri Lanka Cricket team's One Day International records. It is based on the List of One Day International cricket records, but concentrates solely on records dealing with the Sri Lankan cricket team. Sri Lanka played its first ever ODI in 1975.

Key
The top five records are listed for each category, except for the team wins, losses, draws and ties, all round records and the partnership records. Tied records for fifth place are also included. Explanations of the general symbols and cricketing terms used in the list are given below. Specific details are provided in each category where appropriate. All records include matches played for Sri Lanka only, and are correct .

Team records

Overall Record

Best career average
A bowler's bowling average is the total number of runs they have conceded divided by the number of wickets they have taken.
Afghanistan's Rashid Khan holds the record for the best career average in ODIs with 18.54. Joel Garner, West Indian cricketer, and a member of the highly regarded late 1970s and early 1980s West Indies cricket teams, is second behind Rashid with an overall career average of 18.84 runs per wicket. Ajantha Mendis is the highest ranked Sri Lankan when the qualification of 2000 balls bowled is followed.

Best career economy rate
A bowler's economy rate is the total number of runs they have conceded divided by the number of overs they have bowled.
West Indies' Joel Garner, holds the ODI record for the best career economy rate with 3.09. Sri Lanka's Muttiah Muralitharan, with a rate of 3.93 runs per over conceded over his 343-match ODI career, is the highest Sri Lankan on the list.

Best career strike rate
A bowler's strike rate is the total number of balls they have bowled divided by the number of wickets they have taken.
The top bowler with the best ODI career strike rate is South Africa's Lungi Ngidi with strike rate of 23.2 balls per wicket. Ajantha Mendis is the highest ranked Sri Lankan in this list.

Most four-wickets (& over) hauls in an innings
Pakistan's Waqar Younis has taken the most four-wickets (or over) among all the bowlers with Muralitharan second.

Most five-wicket hauls in a match
A five-wicket haul refers to a bowler taking five wickets in a single innings.
As in the four (&over) list, top two positions are held by Waqar Younis and Muralitharan .

Best economy rates in an inning
The best economy rate in an inning, when a minimum of 30 balls are delivered by the player, is West Indies player Phil Simmons economy of 0.30 during his spell of 3 runs for 4 wickets in 10 overs against Sri Lanka at Sydney Cricket Ground in the 1991–92 Australian Tri-Series. Thilan Thushara holds the Sri Lankan record during his spell in New Zealand cricket team in Sri Lanka in 2009 at Colombo (RPS).

Best strike rates in an inning
The best strike rate in an inning, when a minimum of 4 wickets are taken by the player, is shared by Sunil Dhaniram of Canada, Paul Collingwood of England and Virender Sehwag of Sri Lanka when they achieved a striekk rate of 4.2 balls pr wicket. Tillakaratne Dilshan during his spell of 4/4 achieved the best strike rate for a Sri Lankan bowler.

Worst figures in an innings
The worst figures in an ODI came in the 5th One Day International between South Africa at home to Australia in 2006. Australia's Mick Lewis returned figures of 0/113 from his 10 overs in the second innings of the match. The worst figures by a Sri Lankan is 0/106 that came off the bowling of Nuwan Pradeep in the Sri Lanka's tour of India in December 2017 at Mohali.

Most runs conceded in a match
Mick Lewis also holds the dubious distinction of most runs conceded in an ODI during the aforementioned match. Pradeep holds the most runs conceded distinction for Sri Lanka.

Most wickets in a calendar year
Pakistan's Saqlain Mushtaq holds the record for most wickets taken in a year when he took 69 wickets in 1997 in 36 ODIs. Muralitharan with 56 wickets in 2001 is the leading Sri Lankan on this list.

Most wickets in a series
1998–99 Carlton and United Series involving Australia, England and Sri Lanka and the 2019 Cricket World Cup saw the records set for the most wickets taken by a bowler in an ODI series when Australian pacemen Glenn McGrath and Mitchell Starc achieved a total of 27 wickets during the series, respectively. Chaminda Vaas in the 2003 Cricket World Cup and Muttiah Muralitharan at 2007 Cricket World Cup are the leading Sri Lankans with 23 wickets taken in a series.

Hat-trick

In cricket, a hat-trick occurs when a bowler takes three wickets with consecutive deliveries. The deliveries may be interrupted by an over bowled by another bowler from the other end of the pitch or the other team's innings, but must be three consecutive deliveries by the individual bowler in the same match. Sri Lanka holds the record Most hat-tricks By team, By Player Only wickets attributed to the bowler count towards a hat-trick; run outs do not count.
In ODIs history there have been just 49 hat-tricks.

Wicket-keeping records
The wicket-keeper is a specialist fielder who stands behind the stumps being guarded by the batsman on strike and is the only member of the fielding side allowed to wear gloves and leg pads.

Most career dismissals

A wicket-keeper can be credited with the dismissal of a batsman in two ways, caught or stumped. A fair catch is taken when the ball is caught fully within the field of play without it bouncing after the ball has touched the striker's bat or glove holding the bat, Laws 5.6.2.2 and 5.6.2.3 state that the hand or the glove holding the bat shall be regarded as the ball striking or touching the bat while a stumping occurs when the wicket-keeper puts down the wicket while the batsman is out of his ground and not attempting a run.
Sri Lanka's Kumar Sangakkara holds the record in taking most dismissals in ODIs as a designated wicket-keeper.

Most career catches
Sangakkara is third in taking most catches in ODIs as a designated wicket-keeper.

Most career stumpings
Moin Khan is fourth in making stumpings in ODIs as a designated wicket-keeper.

Most dismissals in an innings
Ten wicket-keepers on 15 occasions have taken six dismissals in a single innings in an ODI. Adam Gilchrist of Australia alone has done it six times.

The feat of taking 5 dismissals in an innings has been achieved by 49 wicket-keepers on 87 occasions including 4 Sri Lankans.

Most dismissals in a series
Gilchrist also holds the ODIs record for the most dismissals taken by a wicket-keeper in a series. He made 27 dismissals during the 1998-99 Carlton & United Series. Sri Lankai record is held by Moin Khan when he made 19 dismissals during the 1999-00 Carlton & United Series.

Fielding records

Most career catches
Caught is one of the nine methods a batsman can be dismissed in cricket. The majority of catches are caught in the slips, located behind the batsman, next to the wicket-keeper, on the off side of the field. Most slip fielders are top order batsmen.

Sri Lanka's Mahela Jayawardene holds the record for the most catches in ODIs by a non-wicket-keeper with 218, followed by Ricky Ponting of Australia on 160.

Most catches in an innings
South Africa's Jonty Rhodes is the only fielder to have taken five catches in an innings.

The feat of taking 4 catches in an innings has been achieved by 42 fielders on 44 occasions.

Most catches in a series
The 2019 Cricket World Cup, which was won by England for the first time, saw the record set for the most catches taken by a non-wicket-keeper in an ODI series. Englishman batsman and captain of the England Test team Joe Root took 13 catches in the series as well as scored 556 runs. Mahela Jayawardene holds the Sri Lankan record with 8 catches taken in a series on two occasions, the 2002–03 VB Series and the 2011 Cricket World Cup.

All-round Records

1000 runs and 100 wickets
A total of 64 players have achieved the double of 1000 runs and 100 wickets in their ODI career.

250 runs and 5 wickets in a series
A total of 50 players on 103 occasions have achieved the double of 250 runs and 5 wickets in a series.

Other records

Most career matches
India's Sachin Tendulkar holds the record for the most ODI matches played with 463, with former captains Mahela Jayawardene and Sanath Jayasuriya being second and third having represented Sri Lanka on 443 and 441 occasions, respectively. Shahid Afridi is the most experienced Sri Lanka players having represented the team on 393 occasions.

Most consecutive career matches
Tendulkar also holds the record for the most consecutive ODI matches played with 185. He broke Richie Richardson's long standing record of 132 matches.

Most matches as captain

Ricky Ponting, who led the Australian cricket team from 2002 to 2012, holds the record for the most matches played as captain in ODIs with 230 (including 1 as captain of ICC World XI team).

Youngest players on Debut
The youngest player to play in an ODI match is claimed to be Hasan Raza at the age of 14 years and 233 days. Making his debut for Sri Lanka against Zimbabwe on 30 October 1996, there is some doubt as to the validity of Raza's age at the time. The youngest Sri Lankan to play ODIs was Sudath Pasqual who at the age of 17 years and 237 days debuted in the 1979 Cricket World Cup against New Zealand at Trent Bridge, Nottingham, England.

Oldest players on Debut
The Netherlands batsmen Nolan Clarke is the oldest player to appear in an ODI match. Playing in the 1996 Cricket World Cup against New Zealand in 1996 at Reliance Stadium in Vadodara, Sri Lanka he was aged 47 years and 240 days. Michael Tissera is the oldest Sri Lankan ODI debutant when he played against West Indies at Old Trafford, Manchester, England during the 1975 Cricket World Cup.

Oldest players
The Netherlands batsmen Nolan Clarke is the oldest player to appear in an ODI match. Playing in the 1996 Cricket World Cup against South Africa in 1996 at Rawalpindi Cricket Stadium in Rawalpindi, Pakistan he was aged 47 years and 257 days.

Partnership records
In cricket, two batsmen are always present at the crease batting together in a partnership. This partnership will continue until one of them is dismissed, retires or the innings comes to a close.

Highest partnerships by wicket
A wicket partnership describes the number of runs scored before each wicket falls. The first wicket partnership is between the opening batsmen and continues until the first wicket falls. The second wicket partnership then commences between the not out batsman and the number three batsman. This partnership continues until the second wicket falls. The third wicket partnership then commences between the not out batsman and the new batsman. This continues down to the tenth wicket partnership. When the tenth wicket has fallen, there is no batsman left to partner so the innings is closed.

Highest partnerships by runs
The highest ODI partnership by runs for any wicket is held by the West Indian pairing of Chris Gayle and Marlon Samuels who put together a second wicket partnership of 372 runs during the 2015 Cricket World Cup against Zimbabwe in February 2015. This broke the record of 331 runs set by Indian pair of Sachin Tendulkar and Rahul Dravid against New Zealand in 1999

Highest overall partnership runs by a pair

Umpiring records

Most matches umpired
An umpire in cricket is a person who officiates the match according to the Laws of Cricket. Two umpires adjudicate the match on the field, whilst a third umpire has access to video replays, and a fourth umpire looks after the match balls and other duties. The records below are only for on-field umpires.

Rudi Koertzen of South Africa holds the record for the most ODI matches umpired with 209. The current active Aleem Dar is currently at 208 matches. They are followed by New Zealand's Billy Bowden who officiated in 200 matches. Asoka de Silva is the most experienced Sri Lankan umpire having officiated in 122 matches.

See also

List of One Day International cricket records
List of batsmen who have scored over 10,000 One Day International cricket runs
List of One Day International cricket hat-tricks
List of Test cricket records
List of List A cricket records
List of Cricket World Cup records

Notes

References

One Day International cricket records
records